The All-American Bowl Player of the Year Award (formerly known as the Hall Trophy and U.S. Army Player of the Year Award) has been awarded annually since 2000 to the most outstanding high school football player in the United States, comparable to the Heisman Trophy for collegiate football players. The award is named after Ken “Sugarland Express” Hall, who was the all-time leading rusher in high school football history for 59 years (11,232 yards). The Trophy is cast in the likeness of Ken Hall in his 1950s uniform. The Trophy presentation takes place after the high school season at a formal dinner on the evening before the U.S. Army All-American Bowl.

Past winners

References 

High school football trophies and awards in the United States
Most valuable player awards
Awards established in 2000